This is a list of incorporated cities in Canada, in alphabetical order categorized by province or territory. More thorough lists of communities are available for each province.

Capital cities

Alberta  

A community is not always incorporated as a city even if it meets these requirements. The urban service areas of Fort McMurray and Sherwood Park are hamlets recognized as equivalents of cities, but remain unincorporated. Ten towns are also eligible for city status but remain incorporated as towns.

Alberta has 19 cities. Beaumont is Alberta's newest city, incorporating from town status on January 1, 2019.

Notes:

British Columbia  

In British Columbia, a community can be incorporated as a city if its population exceeds 5,000. Once so incorporated, a city does not lose this status even if its population later declines; the once-larger City of Greenwood, for example, now has a population of just 665 people.

British Columbia has 53 cities.

Notes:

Manitoba 

A community in Manitoba may seek city status once reaching a population of 7,500. Manitoba's newest city is Morden, which changed from town to city status on August 24, 2012.

Manitoba has 10 cities.

Notes:

New Brunswick  

New Brunswick has eight cities.

Notes:

Newfoundland and Labrador 

Newfoundland and Labrador has three cities.

Notes:

Northwest Territories 

As in the other two Canadian territories, the only incorporated city in the Northwest Territories is its capital, Yellowknife.

Nova Scotia 

Nova Scotia no longer has any incorporated cities, as they were amalgamated into regional municipalities in the 1990s.

Halifax – provincial capital and metropolitan area and formerly the largest city in Nova Scotia by population, now part of the Halifax Regional Municipality
Sydney – formerly the smallest city in Nova Scotia by population, now part of the Cape Breton Regional Municipality
Dartmouth – formerly a city in Nova Scotia, now part of the Halifax Regional Municipality

Nunavut 

As in the other two Canadian territories, the only incorporated city in Nunavut is its capital, Iqaluit.

Ontario  

Ontario has 52 cities. In Ontario, city status is conferred by the provincial government, generally upon the request of the incorporated municipality. A municipality may apply for city status anytime after its population surpasses 10,000. This status is not automatically conferred on a community that reaches this population target, but must be requested by the municipality and granted by the provincial Ministry of Municipal Affairs and Housing. Not all municipalities which reach this population target have pursued city designation. For example, Ajax, Oakville, and Whitby, which all had populations greater than 100,000 in 2011, are still designated as towns. Once designated a city, however, a municipality does not lose this status even if its population later falls back below 10,000 (as, for example, Dryden). Ontario's newest city is Richmond Hill, which changed from town to city status on March 25, 2019.

Prince Edward Island 

Prince Edward Island has two cities.

Notes:

Quebec  

In Quebec, provincial law does not contain any cities at the current time, although the designation exists. — A ville, thought legally a "township", may be informally referred to as a town or a city in English, but this is an arbitrary and subjective distinction. Quebec municipal types are cities (cités), townships (villes), and municipalités (municipalités).

Quebec has 223 villes.

Notes:

Saskatchewan  

In Saskatchewan, Section 39(1) of The Cities Act indicates a town must have a population of 5,000 or more and meet other criteria in order to incorporate as a city, although in the early 20th century several centres such as Saskatoon and Regina were granted city status despite having a smaller population. The City of Melville retains its city status despite dropping below 5,000 people in the 1990s. Kindersley has expressed an interest in applying for city status upon reaching the 5,000 milestone. Saskatchewan's newest city is Warman, which changed from town to city status on October 24, 2012.

Saskatchewan has 16 cities.

Notes:

Yukon  

As in the other two Canadian territories, the only incorporated city in the Yukon is its capital, Whitehorse. Dawson was also previously incorporated as a city, but when the criteria were changed in the 1980s, its status was reduced to that of a town due to population. Through special provision, however, it was officially the town of the city of Dawson until 2001.

See also 

History of cities in Canada
List of the largest cities and towns in Canada by area
List of the largest municipalities in Canada by population
List of Canada city name etymologies
List of cities and towns of Upper Canada
List of cities in North America
List of city nicknames and slogans in Canada
List of largest Canadian cities by census
List of towns in Canada
List of villages in Canada

Notes

References

External links 
Canada by Map: All cities with population
Map
The Canadian Atlas Online